MemorialCare Long Beach Medical Center (LBMC), formerly known as Long Beach Memorial Medical Center, is a hospital in Long Beach, California. It is the flagship hospital of the MemorialCare Health System. The hospital is accredited by the Joint Commission.

Long Beach Memorial is one of only 3 hospitals in California with a 320 Slice CT Scanner and preventive technology and programs such as the Electromagnetic Navigation Bronchoscope (ENB) and the Division of Interventional Neuroradiology. The hospital includes facilities such as the MemorialCare Heart and Vascular Institute, the MemorialCare Todd Cancer Institute, the MemorialCare Rehabilitation Institute, the MemorialCare Orthopedic Institute, the MemorialCare Neuroscience Institute, MemorialCare Joint Replacement Center, Stroke Program and the Emergency Department and Trauma Center.

Miller Children's Hospital is located on the campus of Long Beach Memorial Medical Center.

History
Long Beach Memorial was first established as Seaside Hospital in 1907, co-founded by Fanny Bixby Spencer and Dr. A.C. Sellery. Seaside Memorial Hospital was incorporated on June 23, 1937. In 1960, the hospital moved to its present location; Seaside Park now occupies the original site. In April 2012, Susan Melvin, D.O., clinical professor at UCI-School of Medicine and Western University of Health Sciences, assumed the position of Chief Medical Officer.

Rankings and awards
The hospital first received Magnet designation by the American Nurses Credentialing Center (ANCC) in 2013 and again in 2018.

In the 2017 report card from the Leapfrog Group, an employer-backed nonprofit group focused on health care quality, Long Beach Memorial received a B.

In the 2017 U.S. News & World Report nation's best hospital rankings, Long Beach Memorial is ranked 7th in Los Angeles County.

Union
Registered Nurses of LBMMC have been represented by the California Nurses Association since 2001, a labor union and professional nurses association.

See also
 Community Medical Center Long Beach
 St. Mary Medical Center (Long Beach)
 College Medical Center

References

External links
Long Beach Memorial Medical Center official site
This hospital in the CA Healthcare Atlas A project by OSHPD

Hospital buildings completed in 1907
Hospital buildings completed in 1960
Hospitals in Los Angeles County, California
Buildings and structures in Long Beach, California
Hospitals established in 1907
1907 establishments in California
Trauma centers